Ana Estefanía Dominga Riglos Lezica, by marriage Ana Riglos de Irigoyen (3 August 1788 – 14 July 1870), was a Buenos Aires patrician, an Argentine patriot, wife of the soldier and police chief Miguel de Irigoyen.

Family

Ana Estefanía Dominga Riglos Lezica was born on 3 August 1788 in Buenos Aires.
She was from one of the leading families of Buenos Aires.
Her father was doctor Francisco Javier de Riglos y San Martín de Avellaneda, advocate of the Real Audiencia de Charcas.
Her mother was Juana Lezica y Ortega.
She was recognized as one of the "Patricias Argentinas".
Her father's brother was Miguel Fermín Mariano Riglos San Martín, who married Mercedes de Lasala de Riglos.
Mercedes Lasala was one of the founders of the Sociedad de Beneficencia (Charity Society) created by Bernardino Rivadavia in 1823.

Life

On 22 December 1809 Ana Estefanía married her cousin Miguel Remigio Irigoyen de la Quintana y Riglos (1764–1822).
In May 1810 Ana Estefanía Dominga Riglos de Irigoyen accompanied Casilda Igarzábal de Rodríguez Peña (wife of Nicolás Rodríguez Peña), Melchora Sarratea and other patrician ladies to meet the hesitant Cornelio Saavedra and convince him to support the nascent May Revolution.
On 5 July 1810 she appeared in the list of donors to the expedition to unite the provinces.
She promised to support two men in the First Upper Peru campaign and to donate all her jewelry in case of need.

Ana's husband Miguel Irigoyen died on 11 June 1822.
On 21 September 1824 she married Antonio María Nicómedes Pirán Balbastro (1796–1861).
Her children by the second marriage were Carmen Pirán Riglos (born 1829), Eulalia Pirán Riglos (c. 1831–1922) and Antonio Pirán Riglos.
She died on 14 July 1870.

Notes

Sources

1788 births
1870 deaths
Argentine philanthropists
19th-century Argentine people
19th-century philanthropists